Henry Woolf,  (20 January 1930 – 11 November 2021) was a British actor, theatre director, and teacher of acting, drama, and theatre who lived in Canada. He was a longtime friend and collaborator of 2005 Nobel Laureate Harold Pinter, having stimulated Pinter to write his first play, The Room (1957), in 1956. Woolf served as a faculty member at the University of Saskatchewan from 1983 to 1997 and as artistic director of Shakespeare on the Saskatchewan from 1991 until 2001.

Early life
Henry Woolf was born to Jewish parents in Homerton, London on January 20, 1930. He was educated at Hackney Downs School, where he met Harold Pinter; he and Pinter were friends and collaborators for over 60 years.  He earned a Bachelor of Arts degree from the University of London and then pursued a postgraduate course in directing at the University of Bristol, before going to the United States, to earn a postgraduate diploma  from the College of William and Mary, in Williamsburg, Virginia. In the process of undertaking his directing course at Bristol, he commissioned and directed Harold Pinter's first play, The Room (1957), in which he also originated the role of Mr Kidd.

Professional career
Woolf's film credits include San Ferry Ann (1965), Marat/Sade (1967), Tell Me Lies (1968), The Lion in Winter (1968), Great Catherine (1968), The Bed Sitting Room (1969), Alfred the Great (1969), The Ruling Class (1972), The Love Pill (1972), Galileo (1975), The Rocky Horror Picture Show (1975), Rogue Male (1976), The Hound of the Baskervilles (1978), Gorky Park (1983), Superman III (1983), and Maid to Order (1987). In All You Need Is Cash (1978), a film by the Rutles (a fictional mock-Beatles band jointly created by Eric Idle and Neil Innes), Woolf played a character named Arthur Sultan, a fictional spoof of Maharishi Mahesh Yogi. His later film appearances include in the 2004 short film, Of Note and the 2007 short film smallfilm.

On British television, he played the Man in Harold Pinter's one-man play Monologue (1973); parts in Rutland Weekend Television (1975–1976) and The Sweeney (1975); the Collector in the Doctor Who serial The Sun Makers (1977); served as the host of the 1970s pre-school British educational series Words and Pictures; and performed the role of Doctor Cornelius in the BBC adaptation of Prince Caspian (1989). Woolf also played a role in Steptoe and Son (1973) as local gangster Frankie Barrow, a role which had originated Steptoe and Son Ride Again (1973), the second film spin-off of the series.

Woolf joined the faculty of the University of Saskatchewan in 1983, was promoted to professor in 1990, also serving as head of its Drama Department, and received the university's Master Teacher Award in 1994, before retiring in 1997, at the Canadian mandatory retirement age of 67. Woolf also served as artistic director of the annual summer Shakespeare on the Saskatchewan festival, in Saskatoon, from 1991 until his retirement from that position in 2001. In 2001 Woolf was awarded an honorary Doctor of Laws degree from the University of Saskatchewan.

In March 2003, Woolf directed an all-female production of Twelfth Night, by William Shakespeare, at the University of Winnipeg.

In April 2007, he reprised his roles as Mr Kidd in a production of Pinter's The Room (1957), marking the 50th anniversary of the original production, and as the Man in Pinter's Monologue (1973), both of which occurred at the University of Leeds conference Artist and Citizen: 50 Years of Performing Pinter. He was a member of the Saskatchewan Order of Merit. Woolf received the Saskatchewan Centennial Medal on 17 February 2006 Saskatchewan Centennial Medal.

Personal life
In 1978, with his wife, actress/director Susan Williamson, whom he married in 1968, Woolf moved to Canada where he took a teaching position at the University of Alberta Drama Department. By 1983, they had settled in Saskatoon, Saskatchewan, where they were resident until his death. They had four children.

Woolf died on 11 November 2021, at the age of 91.

Filmography

Notes

References
Andrews, Jamie.  "Interviews: Harold Pinter's 'The Room' ".  Theatre Archive Project (British Library, the University of Sheffield, and AHRC).  Accessed 21 August 2008.  (Transcripts of interviews with Susan Engel, James Severns, Auriol Smith, and Henry Woolf.)
"An Exclusive Neilinnes.org Interview with Henry Woolf (Arthur Sultan)". neilinnes.org (Official Website of Neil Innes).  26 May 2005.  Updated 25 July 2005.  Accessed 23 August 2008.
Eyre, Richard, and Nicholas Wright.  Changing Stages: A View of British Theatre in the Twentieth Century.  London: Bloomsbury Publishing, 2000.  New York: Knopf, 2001.   (10).   (13).
Merritt, Susan Hollis.  "Talking about Pinter". The Pinter Review: Collected Essays 2001 and 2002.  Ed. Francis Gillen and Steven H. Gale (Tampa: U of Tampa P, 2002). 144–67.  (On the Lincoln Center 2001: Harold Pinter Festival Symposia; Woolf participated in "Actors on Pinter", along with Blythe Danner and Liev Schreiber, as quoted.)
–––.  "Monologue at Lincoln Center".  Pinter Review (2002): 171–82.  (Extended performance rev. (19 July 2001) incorporating interview with Woolf (the Man) and director Gari Jones, conducted in New York City, on 29 July 2001.)
Nathan, David.  "First Impressions: Room for a Little One".  Jewish Chronicle 17 March 2000: 43.  (Lead: "Actor Henry Woolf went to school with Harold Pinter and helped him get his [break?] in the theatre with 'The Room'.  Now, Henry and Harold are working together again, David Nathan reports.") [Includes interview with Woolf. Viewable and printable version accessible only to paid subscribers.]
Woolf, Henry. "My 60 Years in Harold's Gang". The Guardian 12 July 2007, Stage. Accessed 21 August 2008.

External links
 
 
 Monologue at haroldpinter.org.
 The Room at haroldpinter.org.

1930 births
2021 deaths
Alumni of the University of London
College of William & Mary alumni
English male film actors
English Jews
English male stage actors
English male television actors
Jewish British male actors
Members of the Saskatchewan Order of Merit
People educated at Hackney Downs School
Homerton
People from the London Borough of Hackney
Academic staff of the University of Saskatchewan
English emigrants to Canada